The discography of Japanese rock band Sekai no Owari consists of Five studio albums, two extended play, four video albums and twelve singles. After self-releasing their first extended play in 2009, Sekai no Owari debuted as an independent artist in 2010 under Lastrum Music Entertainment with the album Earth. After releasing a double A-side single "Tenshi to Akuma" / "Fantasy" at the end of 2010, Sekai no Owari parted with their previous label, signing with major label Toy's Factory. The group released their second album Entertainment in 2012, immediately after "Nemurihime", the band's first top five single on the Oricon singles charts.

The band's 2013 single "RPG" became widely successful, reaching number one on the Billboard Japan Hot 100, and later becoming certified double platinum by the RIAJ. Following this with the also successful singles "Snow Magic Fantasy" (2014), "Honō to Mori no Carnival" (2014) and the Nicky Romero-produced "Dragon Night" (2014). These releases culminated in the group's third album, Tree, which debuted at number one in Japan.

In addition to the band's main releases, the band has collaborated with American electronic act Owl City for the single "Tokyo" (2014), and vocalist Fukase  with dōjin music project Livetune for the single "Take Your Way" (2013). The band members wrote the Johnny & Associates boyband Kanjani Eight's single "Namida no Kotae" (2013), the theme song for the drama Hyakkai Naku Koto.

Though primarily singing in Japanese, Sekai no Owari released an English language version of "Dragon Night" in June 2015. For the release of the films Attack on Titan and Attack on Titan: End of the World (2015), Sekai no Owari released two entirely English language singles for the theme songs, "Anti-Hero" and "SOS".

Albums

Studio albums

Compilation albums

Extended plays

Singles

As lead artist

As featured artist

Promotional singles

Collaborations

Other charted songs

Video albums

Notes

References

Discographies of Japanese artists
Pop music discographies